Dangerous Liaisons is an American period drama television series, based upon the novel of the same name by Pierre Choderlos de Laclos. It premiered on Starz on November 6, 2022. Ahead of its premiere, the series was renewed for a second season. In December 2022, the series was canceled, reversing the early renewal. It was also reported that the executive producers are currently shopping the series elsewhere.

Cast and characters

Episodes

Production

Development 
In November 2013, it was announced Christopher Hampton would adapt Dangerous Liaisons by Pierre Choderlos de Laclos, with Colin Callender and Tony Krantz set to serve as executive producers, with BBC set to distribute in the United Kingdom. In July 2019, it was announced Starz had ordered and greenlit the series, with Harriet Warner set to serve as showrunner and writer, with BBC no longer attached, and Hampton no longer attached as writer, and only as executive producer. In November 2022, Starz renewed the series for a second season. The following month, Starz canceled the series. However, the remaining episodes of the first season will air as scheduled. It was also reported that the executive producers are currently shopping the series elsewhere.

Casting 
In May 2021, Alice Englert and Nicholas Denton joined the cast of the series. In June 2021, Lesley Manville, Carice van Houten, Paloma Faith, Michael McElhatton, Kosar Ali, Nathanael Saleh, Hakeem Kae-Kazim, Hilton Pelser, Mia Therapleton, Colette Dalal Tchantcho, Lucy Cohu, Fisayo Akinade, Maria Friedman and Clare Higgins joined the cast of the series.

Filming 
Principal photography began in the Czech Republic in May 2021.

Reception
The review aggregator website Rotten Tomatoes reported a 50% approval rating with an average rating of 6.3/10, based on 14 critic reviews. The website's critics consensus reads, "While Alice Englert and Nicholas Denton make for a convincingly dangerous duo, this prequel to the esteemed novel feels too calculated to stir up a ton of heat." Metacritic, which uses a weighted average, assigned a score of 57 out of 100 based on 9 critics, indicating "mixed or average reviews".

References

External links 
 Dangerous Liaisons - Official Website 
 

2020s American drama television series
2022 American television series debuts
2022 American television series endings
Starz original programming
Television series by Lionsgate Television
Television series set in the 18th century
Television shows set in France
Television shows filmed in the Czech Republic
Works based on Les Liaisons dangereuses